Carmen, officially the Municipality of Carmen,  is a 3rd class municipality in the province of Cebu, Philippines. According to the 2020 census, it has a population of 57,897 people.

The town fiesta is celebrated every 28 August in honor of St. Augustine of Hippo.

History

The town of Carmen was formerly known as Bugho, it became a municipality on June 16, 1851, through the efforts of Facundo Buot. The first municipal president was Fabio Buot when the first elections was held by the Americans in 1899.

Geography
Carmen is bordered on the north by the town of Catmon, to the west by the town of Tuburan, on the east by the Camotes Sea, and on the south by the City of Danao.

Barangays

Carmen comprises 21 barangays:

Climate

Demographics

Economy

Mandaue City-based Shemberg Marketing Corporation, the world's number one supplier of refined carrageenan since 2005, owns and operates the Shemberg Biotech Corporation located in Barangay Cogon West.

The famous 7D mango product manufacturer FPD Foods International Inc. has one of its branches located at Dawis Norte, Carmen, Cebu.

Metro, a stand-alone supermarket opens branch in Carmen, Cebu. Located at the heart of the town's commercial area near the town's public market.

A famous exporter of home decors and furniture maker Yoshio Home Decors also provides employment in the town as well as additional revenue for the local government.

Carmen is also known for its homegrown 
signature product sinamay, made of abaca. Sinamay industry in carmen is one of kind that we can be proud of. Thus, making the town as "The sinamay capital of Cebu". These sinamay products are passionately weaved by the locals with such high quality standard.

Tourism
Carmen is home to the Cebu Safari and Adventure Park, an adventure and safari park, located in the municipality's barangay Corte. The park opened in 2018 and is a popular tourist destination not just for Carmen, but for Cebu as a whole.

Before Sinulog started in Cebu City in 1980, the town of Carmen had already dancing the beat and rhythm similar to that of the Sinulog way back in 1974. It was started by Fr. Jose Motus, the parish priest, and then-mayor Benyong Villamor, and patterned it from his hometown's festival, the Ati-Atihan of Kalibo, Aklan. During its launching it was named Ati-Atihan sa Carmen, but renamed Sinulog sa Carmen the following year. From then on, the Sinulog sa Carmen is held in every second Sunday of January, just a week before the Sinulog Grand Parade in Cebu City. Participating contingents dance their way around the municipality to honor the Santo Niño. However, given the popularity of the latter, the date was moved to the Sunday following the feast, bringing it in line with the Dinagyang Festival of Iloilo.

Notable personalities

Mariano Jesus Cuenco - former Senator and the fourth Senate President.
Jose Maria Cuenco - the first Archbishop of the Archdiocese of Jaro.
Reed Juntilla - former PBA player.

See also
Municipalities of the Philippines
Legislative districts of Cebu
Cebu
Central Visayas
Carrageenan
Benson Dakay

References

External links

 
 [ Philippine Standard Geographic Code]

Municipalities of Cebu